Oak Park is a community in the Canadian province of Nova Scotia, located in the Municipality of the District of Barrington of Shelburne County.

Barrington Municipal High School is there. Formerly the road was Highway 3, but since then a new bypass was built for Highway 103, with Exit 30 near the head of the road.

See also
 List of communities in Nova Scotia

References

External links
Oak Park on Destination Nova Scotia

Communities in Shelburne County, Nova Scotia
General Service Areas in Nova Scotia